Dochmonota is a genus of beetles belonging to the family Staphylinidae.

The species of this genus are found in Europe and Northern America.

Species:
 Dochmonota clancula (Erichson, 1837) 
 Dochmonota langori Klimaszewski & Larson, 2016

References

Staphylinidae
Staphylinidae genera